Shawwal is the tenth month of the lunar based Islamic calendar. Shawwāl stems from the verb shāla which means to 'lift or carry', generally to take or move things from one place to another,

Fasting during Shawwāl
The first day of Shawwāl is Eid al-Fitr, fasting is prohibited. Some Muslims observe six days of optional fasting during Shawwāl beginning the day after Eid ul-Fitr since fasting is prohibited on this day. These six days of fasting together with the Ramadan fasts, are equivalent to fasting all year round. The reasoning behind this tradition is that a good deed in Islam is rewarded 10 times, hence fasting 30 days during Ramadan and 6 days during Shawwāl is equivalent to fasting the whole year in fulfillment of the obligation.

The Shia scholars do not place any emphasis on the six days being consecutive while among the Sunnis the majority of Shafi`i scholars consider it recommended to fast these days consecutively. They based this on a hadith related by Tabarani and others wherein Muhammad is reported to have said, "Fasting six consecutive days after Eid al-Fitr is like fasting the entire year." Other traditional scholarly sources among the Hanafiyya and Hanbaliyya do not place an emphasis on consecutive days, while the strongest opinion of the Malikiyya prefers any six days of the month, consecutively or otherwise.

Timing
The Islamic calendar is a lunar calendar, and months begin when the first crescent of a new moon is sighted. Since the Islamic lunar calendar year is 11 to 12 days shorter than the solar year, Shawwāl migrates throughout the seasons. The estimated start and end dates for Shawwāl, based on the Umm al-Qura calendar of Saudi Arabia, are:

Islamic events

 Every 1st day of Shawwāl, Eid al-Fitr is celebrated throughout the Muslim World for three consecutive days until the 3rd day of this month (but celebrations of the festival lasts until the 29th/30th day as per the festive season's duration).
 07 Shawwāl 3 AH, early Muslims took part in the Battle of Uhud.
10 Shawwal, birth of  Ahmed Raza khan.
 13 Shawwāl, primary traditionist of the Sunni Muslims, Muhammad al-Bukhari, was born in 194 AH.
 18 Shawwal, urs of Sufi Mystic And Poet Amir Khusro.
 22 Shawwāl 1284 AH, death of Haji Dost Muhammad Qandhari, an Afghan Sufi master of Naqshbandi tradition.
 25 Shawwāl 148 AH, martyrdom of Imām Ja‘far as-Sādiq.

Notes

External links
Islamic-Western Calendar Converter (Based on the Arithmetical or Tabular Calendar)

91
Islamic terminology